The HQ-16 is a medium-range surface-to-air missile (SAM) from the People's Republic of China. It is derived from earlier versions of the Russian Buk missile system.

Development 
Development began in 2005, and was reportedly assisted by the Almaz-Antey Corporation. It was  initially developed as a naval system. In late-2011, China reported the "co-development between Russia and China" of the missile was complete.

The HQ-16B was developed by late-2011.

A ground battery consists of a command post, two multifunction radars, and four to six launchers. Each launcher has six missiles.

Operational history
The platform for the HHQ-16, the Type 054A frigate, entered service in 2008. The HQ-16A entered service in 2011.

The HQ-16A entered Chinese service in 2011.

Pakistan entered negotiations to purchase the missile in 2015. The LY-80s entered service with the Pakistan Army in March 2017.

Variants
HQ-16A
HHQ-16
Naval variant.
HQ-16B
Improved variant with slant range exceeding .
HQ-16C
Improved variant with slant range exceeding .
LY-80
Export variant.
LY-80N
Export naval variant.
HQ-16FE

Operators 
 
People's Liberation Army Ground Force - 200 HQ-16A & HQ-16B 
People's Liberation Army Navy - HHQ-16. 
 
LY-80, LY-80N.

References

Sources

Surface-to-air missiles of the People's Republic of China
Naval surface-to-air missiles
Military equipment introduced in the 2010s